DIALIGN-TX is a multiple sequence alignment program written by Amarendran R. Subramanian and is substantial improvement of DIALIGN-T by combining greedy and progressive alignment strategies in a new algorithm.

The original DIALIGN-T is a reimplementation of the multiple-alignment program DIALIGN. Due to several algorithmic improvements, it produces significantly better alignments on locally and globally related sequence sets than previous versions of DIALIGN. However, like the original implementation of the program, DIALIGN-T uses a straightforward greedy approach to assemble multiple alignments from local pairwise sequence similarities. Such greedy approaches may be vulnerable to spurious random similarities and can therefore lead to suboptimal results. DIALIGN-TX is a substantial improvement of DIALIGN-T that combines the previous greedy algorithm with a progressive alignment approach.

See also
DIALIGN-T
Sequence alignment software
Clustal

References
 Subramanian AR, Kaufmann M, Morgenstern B. DIALIGN-TX: Greedy and progressive approaches for segment-based multiple sequence alignment. Algorithms for Molecular Biology 2008, 3:6
 Subramanian AR, Weyer-Menkhoff J, Kaufmann M, Morgenstern B. DIALIGN-T: An improved algorithm for segment-based multiple sequence alignment. BMC Bioinformatics 2005, 6:66

External links
Official website

Phylogenetics software